is a Japanese television drama series. It premiered on 3 July 2014 and is broadcast on Yomiuri TV and on Nippon TV. It's streamed on Crunchyroll in several territories since 4 July 2014.

Plot
The series is set in Tokyo.

Cast

Main
Takanori Jinnai as Kentarō Shiba, a director of the hospital
Miyu Yoshimoto as Hinako Shiba, Kentarō's non-blooded daughter
Yōko Nogiwa as Hanae Shiba, a nurse
Tetsuya Makita as Shinya Tamaki, a veterinary

Guest
 Yumiko Shaku as Hitomi Asano (Ep.1)
 Akiko Hinagata as Rina Koizumi (Ep.4)
 Yoko Minamino as Yuki Tamaki (Ep.9)
 Mako Ishino as Tōko Mizusawa (Ep.10)
 Guts Ishimatsu as Tatsuo (EP.10)
 Yūko Asano as Nanako Sakura (Ep.12)

References

External links
Is There a Vet in the House? on Yomiuri TV
Is There a Vet in the House? on Crunchyroll

2014 Japanese television series debuts
Japanese drama television series
Nippon TV dramas
Yomiuri Telecasting Corporation original programming